Spanish Formosa was a small colony of the Spanish Empire established in the northern tip of the island known to Europeans at the time as Formosa (now Taiwan) from 1626 to 1642. It was ceded to the Dutch Republic during the Eighty Years' War.

The Portuguese were the first Europeans to reach the island off the southern coast of China in 1544, and named it Formosa (Portuguese for "beautiful") due to the beautiful landscape as seen from the sea. 

Northern Taiwan became a Spanish colony in 1626 and part of the Manila-based Spanish East Indies. As a Spanish colony, it was meant to protect the regional trade with the Philippines from interference by the Dutch base in the south of the island. The colony was short-lived due to the loss of its strategic importance and unwillingness by Spanish authorities in Manila to commit more resources to its defence. After seventeen years, the last fortress of the Spanish was besieged by Dutch forces and eventually fell, giving the Dutch control over much of the island.

Spanish missionaries Christianized about 5,000 Taiwanese during the time of the Spanish governorate.

Background
In 1566, the Dutch rose up against the King Philip II in Hapsburg Netherlands. The Dutch Republic and its allies, England and France attacked and looted some of Spain's overseas territories, as part of the Eighty Years' War.

The Spanish cut the Dutch rebels off from the spice trade based in Lisbon, making it necessary for the Dutch to send their own expeditions to the sources of these commodities to take control of the much desired spice trade in the East Indies.

As a result of the Iberian Union of Portugal and Spain in 1580, the Dutch of the Seventeen Provinces fought the Dutch–Portuguese War. Allies England and France became enemies of both Portugal and Spain.
 
The Dutch colonisation of Formosa was part of the unsuccessful campaign to seize the possessions of the Spanish Habsburgs in Asia, including the Philippines. The Dutch began to attack a string of often undermanned coastal fortresses that comprised the Habsburg's Portuguese African and Asian possessions. The settlements were sometimes isolated, difficult to reinforce if attacked, and prone to being picked off one by one. However, the Dutch were mostly unsuccessful in these attempts.

Pursuing their quest for alternative routes to Asia for trade, the first Dutch privateer squadron to reach the Philippines on 14 December 1600 was led by pirate Olivier van Noort. The Dutch sought to dominate the commercial sea trade in Southeast Asia, often engaging in piracy and privateering. They attempted to disrupt trade by harassing the coasts of Manila Bay and its environs, and preyed on sampans and junks from China and Japan trading at Manila.

In the context of this competition for trade, the Dutch established a colony at Tayouan, present-day Anping, in the south of Formosa. From there they tried threaten Spain's trade in the region. As a counter to this threat, the Spanish colonial authorities in Manila decided to establish their own colony in the north of the island.

Political organisation
Formosa was a governorate. The governor reported to the captain general in Manila. The captain general's superior was the viceroy of New Spain in Mexico City, who, in turn, was appointed by the king of Spain.

The governors of Formosa were:
 Antonio Carreño Valdés, 1626–1629
 Juan de Alcarazo, 1629–1632
 Bartolomé Díaz Barrera, 1632–1634
 Alonso García Romero, 1634–1635
 Francisco Hernández, 1635–1637
 Pedro Palomino, 1637–1639
 Cristóbal Márquez, 1639–1640
 Gonzalo Portillo, 1640–1642

The early years (1626–1629)

Landing at Cape Santiago in the north-east of Formosa but finding it unsuitable for defensive purposes, the Spanish continued westwards along the coast until they arrived at Keelung. A deep and well-protected harbour plus a small island in the mouth of the harbour made it the ideal spot to build the first settlement, which they named Santissima Trinidad. Forts were built, both on the island and in the harbour itself.

In 1629 the Spanish erected a second base, centred on Fort San Domingo, in Tamsui.

First battle with the Dutch

In 1641, the Spanish colony in the north had become such an irritant to the Dutch in the south that they decided to take northern Formosa by force. This attempt would prove a failure. In courteous terms, the Dutch governor, Paulus Traudenius, informed the Spanish governor of their intentions.

The Spanish governor was not inclined to give in so easily and replied in kind.

Subsequently, the Dutch launched an assault on the northern regions held by the Spanish, but the positions were well-defended and the attacking troops were not able to breach the walls of the fortresses. They returned, thwarted and humiliated, to the Dutch base at Fort Zeelandia.

Second battle with the Dutch

In 1642, the Spanish governor in Manila recalled most of his Formosa troops for an expedition in the Philippines. In August that year, to profit from the relatively undefended Spanish position, the Dutch returned to Keelung with four large ships, several smaller ships, and approximately 369 Dutch soldiers. A combination of Spaniards, Formosan natives, and Kapampangan from the Philippines attempted to hold off the larger Dutch force. After six days of battle, the small force surrendered the fort and was returned to Manila defeated, giving up their flags and what little artillery that had remained with them. Sebastián Hurtado de Corcuera, governor of the Philippines, was blamed for the loss of Formosa and was eventually tried in court for his actions. Upon conviction, he was imprisoned for five years in the Philippines. Historians since Corcuera's time have chastised him for the loss of the settlement in Formosa but other factors, such as the limited military resources available for the defence of the remote territory, played a role in the loss.

See also

Dutch Formosa  
Kingdom of Middag
Kingdom of Tungning
Spanish expedition to Formosa

References

Bibliography

 
Spanish East Indies
Former colonies in Asia
Former Spanish colonies
Spanish Formosa
1620s in the Spanish East Indies
1630s in the Spanish East Indies
1640s in the Spanish East Indies
New Spain
States and territories established in 1626
States and territories disestablished in 1642
1626 establishments in the Spanish East Indies
1626 establishments in New Spain
1642 disestablishments in New Spain
1626 establishments in Asia
1642 disestablishments in Asia
Spain–Taiwan relations